The Malta national under-17 football team represents Malta in international football competitions such as the FIFA U-17 World Cup, the UEFA European Under-17 Championship, as well as any other under-17 international football tournaments. It is governed by the Malta Football Association. In October 2009, Malta qualified from its group to the Elite Round that was played in March 2010. This success came around following a victory over the Netherlands 2-1 and an 0-0 draw with group host nation Andorra, after having lost the first match against Northern Ireland 2-0. Malta qualified as the best third-placed team.

UEFA European Under-17 Championship record

  2002: Did not qualify
  2003: Did not qualify 
  2004: Did not qualify 
  2005: Did not qualify
  2006: Did not qualify
  2007: Did not qualify 
  2008: Did not qualify 
  2009: Did not qualify
  2010: Did not qualify - Elite Round
  2011: Did not qualify
  2012: Did not qualify
  2013: Did not qualify
  2014: Group Stage - (hosts)
  2015: Did not qualify
  2016: Did not qualify
  2017: Did not qualify
  2018: TBD

Recent results

Current squad 
 The following players were called up for the 2023 UEFA European Under-17 Championship qualification matches.
 Match dates: 19–25 October 2022
 Opposition: ,  and Caps and goals correct as of:''' 25 September 2022, after the match against

References

External links
Official site of the Malta Football Association
www.maltasport.com
www.maltafootball.com

Under-17
European national under-17 association football teams
Youth football in Malta